Dorcadion terolense is a species of beetle in the family Cerambycidae. It was described by Escalera in 1902. It is known from Spain.

Varietas
 Dorcadion terolense var. albovittatum Breuning, 1947
 Dorcadion terolense var. bicolorevittatum Breuning, 1947
 Dorcadion terolense var. flavidum Breuning, 1947
 Dorcadion terolense var. georgei Pic, 1904
 Dorcadion terolense var. glabripenne Pic, 1904
 Dorcadion terolense var. multiplicatum Pic, 1908
 Dorcadion terolense var. nigerrimum Breuning, 1947
 Dorcadion terolense var. nigritipes Breuning, 1947
 Dorcadion terolense var. transeuns Breuning, 1947

See also 
Dorcadion

References

terolense
Beetles described in 1902